Mukim Sungai Kedayan is a mukim in Brunei-Muara District, Brunei. It is located within Kampong Ayer, the historical stilt settlements on the Brunei River in the capital Bandar Seri Begawan. The population was 230 in 2016.

Villages 
Majority of the villages in the mukim no longer exists; as of 2016, the only populated village is Kampong Sumbiling Lama. This is due to an urban regeneration project undertaken by the government in mid-2010s which involved redeveloping parts of the river banks of Sungai Kedayan adjacent to the city centre into an urban park (now known as Taman Mahkota Jubli Emas). The area had been occupied by the aforementioned villages, hence to make way for the project the residents had been relocated, mainly to the available public housing areas.

Demographics 
As of 2016 census, the population was 230 with  males and  females. The mukim had 74 households occupying 73 dwellings. The entire population lived in urban areas.

References 

Sungai Kedayan
Brunei-Muara District